Linda Marie Claridge (born August 24, 1959), also known as Linda Hogan, is an American television personality who is the ex-wife of professional wrestler Hulk Hogan. She is best known for her role on the American reality television show Hogan Knows Best.

Early years
Claridge was raised Catholic and is of American, Australian, British and Irish descent. She is the older sister of actress Christie Claridge. In 1977, she graduated from Chatsworth High School in California. She was a winning contestant on Match Game in 1978.

Career 
In 1995, Claridge appeared on Hulk Hogan's album Hulk Rules, where she sang back-up vocals along with The Wrestling Boot Band. Claridge entered the spotlight in 2005 as "Linda Hogan", due to the VH1 reality show Hogan Knows Best. A 2005 documentary DVD on street racers, called Vehicular Lunatics, includes a segment with Claridge. Claridge wrote a book, Wrestling the Hulk: My Life Against the Ropes, which was published in 2011. She appeared on the Season 3, episode 8 of Bar Rescue.

Personal life 
Claridge met Terry Bollea a.k.a. Hulk Hogan in a restaurant in Los Angeles. For nearly two years, the couple had a long-distance relationship mostly over the telephone. They married in 1983 in a wedding attended by André the Giant, Vince McMahon, and other wrestling personalities. They have two children together, Brooke (1988) and Nick (1990). Claridge filed for divorce from Hulk Hogan on November 20, 2007. The divorce was finalized on July 28, 2009.

Claridge received media attention for her relationship with a much younger man, Charley Hill. Hill proposed to her on an episode of the VH1 reality television show Couple's Therapy in 2012. They began dating in 2008, when Claridge was 48 and Hill was 19.

In October 2012, Claridge was arrested in Malibu, California for driving under the influence, with an alcohol level of 0.084. She pleaded guilty to DUI. She was released several hours later after posting bail of $5,000.

References

External links 

1959 births
Female models from Florida
American people of English descent
American people of Australian descent
American people of Irish descent
American socialites
Bollea family
Contestants on American game shows
Living people
Participants in American reality television series
People from Clearwater, Florida
People from Miami
People from Tampa, Florida
Catholics from Florida
21st-century American women
People from Chatsworth, Los Angeles